The name Monica has been used for three tropical cyclones in the Northeastern Pacific Ocean:

Tropical Storm Monica (1967), which spent its life at sea south of Mexico
Hurricane Monica (1971), did not affect land
Tropical Storm Monica (1975), stayed far from land

In the Southern Hemisphere near Australia:
Tropical Cyclone Monica (1984), formed west of New Caledonia, dissipated in the Coral Sea
Cyclone Monica (2006), struck the Northern Territory

Pacific hurricane set index articles
Australian region cyclone set index articles